Brachytheciaceae is a family of mosses from the order Hypnales. The family includes over 40 genera and 250 species.

Description

The family consists of pleurocarpous mosses with very diverse appearances. They are irregular or pinnately branched and form loose mats. The leaves are broad ovate or triangular and are sharply focused at the top. A midrib is always present and usually reaches more than half of the leaf. The leaf cells are prosenchymatous and are many times longer than wide and interlocking with pointed ends.

The sporophyte consists of a regularly formed spore capsule that stands straight on the setae. The spores are distributed through an annular peristome, which is closed off by a beak-shaped operculum in immature plants.

Habitat
Species are terrestrial, epiphytic, or lithophytic plants that are distributed around the world. They grow on various substrates, including rock, bark, and soil.

Taxonomy

Brachytheciaceae is in the order Hypnales. They are a sister group of the Meteoriaceae. The family is divided into four subfamilies, which are distinguished on the basis of molecular research.
 Family: Brachytheciaceae
 Subfamily Eurhychioideae
 Genus: Aerobryum · Bryoandersonia · Eriodon · Eurhynchium · Palamocladium · Plasteurhynchium · Platyhypnidium · Pseudoscleropodium · Rhynchostegium · Scorpiurum
 Subfamily Helicodontoideae
 Genus: Aerolindigia · Cirriphyllum · Clasmatodon · Donrichardsia · Eurhynchiella · †Flabellidium · Helicodontium · Homalotheciella · Juratzkaeella · Mandoniella · Meteoridium · Nobregaea · Okamuraea · Oxyrrhynchium · Remyella · Rhynchostegiella · Schimperella · Squamidium · Zelometeorium
 Subfamily Homalothecioideae
 Genus: Brachytheciastrum · Homalothecium · Eurhynchiastrum
 Subfamily Brachythedioideae
 Genus:  Brachytheciella · Brachythecium · Bryhnia · Eurhynchiadelphus · Kindbergia · Myuroclada · Sciurohypnum · Scleropodium · Unclejackia

Other genera are provisionally placed in the family, including:
 Bryostreimannia 
 Frahmiella
 Lindigia
 Stenocarpidiopsis
 Stokesiella 
 Streimannia

References

Hypnales
Moss_families